Masanori Ohashi (born 7 December 1964) is a Japanese wrestler. He competed in the men's Greco-Roman 48 kg at the 1992 Summer Olympics.

References

External links
 

1964 births
Living people
Japanese male sport wrestlers
Olympic wrestlers of Japan
Wrestlers at the 1992 Summer Olympics
People from Gifu
Asian Wrestling Championships medalists
20th-century Japanese people